Gilles d’Aurigny (also Daurigny, surnamed Le Pamphile, d. 1553) was a French poet and lawyer.

Born in Beauvais, he served as attorney to the Parlement in Paris.
He published a few legal treatises, such as Ordonnances des rois de France (1527, 1528) and  Le Livre de police humaine (translation of a work by François Patrice, 1544).
Little is known about his life. His best-known work is Le Tuteur d'amour of 1546, a poem in decasyllabic verse, at the time noted for its elegant style and rich imagination.

Literary works:
 ...  published in 1516, a Latin commentary on Songe du Verger, a work attributed to  Évrart de Trémaugon
  (1528), published together with the work of the same title by Martial d'Auvergne in 1545 (reprinted several times until 1555).
 , 1545, contains a French translation of Heracles by Lucian of Samosata.
  (1545)
  (1546), reprinted in Lyon 1547  , Paris 1553.
 , published posthumously 1557. This is a more developed version of his Généalogie des Dieux poétiques de 1545.

Spiritual works:
  (1549, reprinted 1551), French translation of biblical psalms, set to music by  Didier Lupi Second, later included in the Psautier de Paris along with works by Clément Marot, Robert Brincel, Claude-Barthélémy Bernard and Christophe Richer.
  (1547), a lost work attributed d'Aurigny by Antoine Du Verdier (1585)

Music 
Wilhelm Killmayer set one of his poems in his song cycle  in 1968.

References

 Abbé Goujet. Gilles d’Aurigny, dit le Pamphile. In Bibliothèque françoise, vol. XII (Paris, 1748), 428f.

1553 deaths
Year of birth unknown
French male writers
People from Beauvais